The Falcomposite Furio is a two-seat kitplane of carbon fibre construction. It is a two-seat, low-wing monoplane with retractable landing gear. The Furio may be powered by a range of four cylinder horizontally opposed piston aircraft engines.

The aircraft kit, designed in New Zealand by brothers Lapo and Giovanni Nustrini, uses advanced composite material technology to reduce the complexity of the structure and therefore reduce the time required to complete construction.

The prototype, registered ZK-LLG, took off on its first flight on 6 February 2008. As of October 2022, five aircraft are identified on the New Zealand register and one in the United States.

Registered Aircraft
New Zealand
ZK-LLG (s/n 001)
ZK-NJS (s/n 002)
ZK-WBW (s/n 003)
ZK-PPK (s/n 007)
ZK-FUO (s/n 014)

United States
N861SA (s/n 005)

Specifications (Furio LN27 RG)

References

External links

 Falcomposite Website

Homebuilt aircraft